The 2022 Challenger La Manche was a professional tennis tournament played on indoor hard courts. It was the 29th edition of the tournament which was part of the 2022 ATP Challenger Tour. It took place in Cherbourg, France between 7 and 13 February 2022.

Singles main-draw entrants

Seeds

 1 Rankings are as of 31 January 2022.

Other entrants
The following players received wildcards into the singles main draw:
  Kenny de Schepper
  Harold Mayot
  Luca Van Assche

The following player received entry into the singles main draw as an alternate:
  Constant Lestienne

The following players received entry from the qualifying draw:
  Dan Added
  Jonáš Forejtek
  Tristan Lamasine
  Jules Marie
  Maximilian Marterer
  Mats Rosenkranz

Champions

Singles

 Benjamin Bonzi def.  Constant Lestienne 6–4, 2–6, 6–4.

Doubles

  Jonathan Eysseric /  Quentin Halys def.  Hendrik Jebens /  Niklas Schell 7–6(8–6), 6–2.

References

2022 ATP Challenger Tour
2022
February 2022 sports events in France
2022 in French tennis